The Jews of Islam (1984) is a book written by Middle-East historian and scholar Bernard Lewis.

The book provides a comprehensive overview of the history and the state of the Jews living in the Islamic world (as contrasted to the Jews of Christendom). The first chapter, Islam and Other Religions, however, is broader in scope, and explains how medieval Islamic society viewed the Other.

Contents 
 Chapter I. Islam and Other religions
 Chapter II. The Judaeo-Islamic Tradition
 Chapter III. The Late Medieval and Early Modern Periods
 Chapter IV. The End of the Tradition

Quotes
Lewis notes that there was greater tolerance for Jews in Islamic lands than in Christian lands. Regarding Jews in Islamic lands, he states:

The author also claims:

Reviews

See also
 Dhimmi
 Jizya

References

Books by Bernard Lewis
Islam and Judaism
Mizrahi Jews topics
History books about Jews and Judaism
1984 non-fiction books